A cytobrush is a plastic tool used to obtain cells from the cervix during the procedure of a pap smear.

References 

Surgical instruments
Gynaecology